David Mervyn Johnston  (born 27 November 1981) is a British politician who has served as the Member of Parliament (MP) for Wantage since 2019. He is a member of the Conservative Party.

On 6 July 2022, he resigned from his Position as Parliamentary Private Secretary at the Department for Education  following the resignations of Rishi Sunak and Sajid Javid.

Early life and education 
Johnston was born in Whitechapel, East London, to parents Mervyn and Carol Johnston. He attended Tom Hood Comprehensive School and Sir George Monoux Sixth Form College, before going on to university at Balliol College, Oxford, where he gained a BA in Modern History and Politics in 2003.

Career
From 2003 to 2006, Johnston was co-ordinator of the Oxford Access Scheme. He then became a director of Future, holding this role from 2006 to 2009.

Before he became an MP, he was chief executive of the Social Mobility Foundation for over ten years, from 2009 to 2020. He was also a member of the Social Mobility Commission from 2012 to 2017.

Johnston was a governor at Sir George Monoux Sixth Form College, where he had studied, from 2008 to 2016, as well as Pimlico Academy from 2008 to 2017. He was elected to Wantage, a safe seat for the Conservative Party in Oxfordshire, in 2019. He succeeded Ed Vaizey.

He served on the Education Select Committee between 2020 and 2021. In September 2021, he was appointed as Parliamentary Private Secretary at the Department for Education. Johnston resigned as PPS on 6 July 2022, following other resignations in protest of Boris Johnson's conduct in the Chris Pincher scandal.

Honours
Johnston was appointed an Officer of the Most Excellent Order of the British Empire (OBE) in 2018 for services to "social mobility and education" through his former role as chief executive of the Social Mobility Foundation.

Personal life 
Johnston's partner is Charlotte Pickles. He lists his recreations as travel, the outdoors and the gym, in addition to being a Liverpool season ticket holder.

References

External links

1981 births
Living people
UK MPs 2019–present
Conservative Party (UK) MPs for English constituencies